Turkey Creek is an unincorporated community in Stone County, Arkansas, United States. The Turkey Creek School, which is listed on the National Register of Historic Places, is located in Turkey Creek.

References

Unincorporated communities in Stone County, Arkansas
Unincorporated communities in Arkansas